Ramakrishna Sudarsanam (26 April 1914 – 26 March 1991)  was an Indian music composer who had worked in Tamil, Hindi, Kannada Malayalam, Telugu and Sinhala film industry

Career 

Ramakrishna Sudarsanam entered the Tamil film industry with Thiruneelakandar in 1939. He was a very talented musician who was spotted by Music Director Sharma Brothers and who into their Music troupe. After getting a lot of experience, he started composing music along with T.A Kalyanam. He became full-fledged music composer in Movie Sakuntalai in 1940. He turned a few songs for this movie but unfortunately, he did not continue with that film due to ill health. Movie producers brought another music composer Rajagopal Sharma for the same film and used already composed Sudarsanam's tunes, but he was not credited.

Later Sudarsanam joined the AVM Studio's Saraswathi Orchestra Company and started working on dubbing for movies. His name first appeared on the silver screen in the film Sri Valli in 1945  along with Thuraiyur Rajagopal Sharma. He became a full-fledged Music Composer in the movie Naam Iruvar in 1947. Later went giving a lot of back to back superhits in films.

He is credited to have composed music for the first movie of stalwart actress and actors like Dr. Rajkumar for Kannada movie Bedara Kannappa,  Sivaji Ganesan for Parasakthi, Kamal Hasan for film Kalathur Kannamma, Vaijayanthi Mala for the movie Vaazhkai'''.

He has introduced many singers to the South Indian film industry, and who have come became most popular and has reached great heights in film music few include S. Janaki, T .M. Soundarajan.

Filmography

References 

Indian musicians
Tamil film score composers
Telugu film score composers
Kannada film score composers
Tamil musicians
1914 births
1991 deaths
20th-century Indian musicians
Malayalam film score composers
Indian male film score composers
20th-century male musicians